"Someplace Good" is a song in the album Eclectic Alternative produced by Bad Ass Music. Its popularity surged greatly in Hong Kong because it is used as a background music in the comedy, To Catch the Uncatchable, made by TVB.

The song's sad feeling and the drama's unexpected sorrowful ending amplified each other greatly, leaving a deep impression on the audience. 
Following the end of the show (22 August 2004), some Hong Kong-based Internet forums questioned the origin of the song, which was finally found a few days later. However, the album was impossible to obtain in Hong Kong, leaving a lot of people disappointed. In 2006, the American TV Channel AMC used the song as an interlude promoting movies shown on its network.

2004 songs